Robert Kjellin (born 11 March 1973) is a Swedish former footballer who played as a defender.

References

External links 
 

Living people
Association football defenders
Swedish footballers
Allsvenskan players
Malmö FF players
1973 births
Sportspeople from Örebro